Waylla Waqran (Quechua waylla meadow, waqra horn, "meadow horn", -n a suffix, also spelled Huayllahuacrán) is mountain in the Cordillera Central in the Andes of Peru which reaches a height of approximately . It is located in the Lima Region, Yauyos Province, on the border of the districts of Huancaya and  Vitis.

References 

Mountains of Lima Region
Mountains of Peru